The 1997 Summer Universiade, also known as the XIX Summer Universiade, took place in the island of Sicily, Italy.

Venues
 Stadio Angelo Massimino, Catania — athletics, ceremony (opening)
 Teatro Massimo Bellini, Catania — fencing
 PalaSanFilippo, Messina — basketball
 Swimming Pool of the Polo dell'Annuziata at the University of Messina, Messina — swimming
 Swimming Pool of the Polo del Centro at the University of Messina, Messina — diving
 Swimming Pool of the Polo del Papardo at the University of Messina, Messina — water polo
 PalaMinardi, Ragusa — basketball
 Palasport A. Giglia, Favara — basketball
 Temporary Outdoor Arena at the Necropolis of Pantalica, Syracuse — gymnastics
 Stadio Renzo Barbera, Palermo — football, ceremony (closing)
 Gymnasium of the University of Palermo, Palermo — volleyball
 Velodromo Borselino, Palermo — tennis

Sports

Medal table

External links
 Official website of the 19th Summer Universiade

 
1997
U
U
U
Multi-sport events in Italy
Sport in Sicily
August 1997 sports events in Europe